Maurice Carthon (born April 24, 1961) is an American former football player and coach.  Carthon was a fullback in the United States Football League (USFL) and National Football League (NFL) for a total of 11 seasons.  After his playing career ended, he became a coach, and served as the offensive coordinator for three NFL teams.

Early years
Carthon attended Osceola High School in Osceola, Arkansas, and was a letterman in football and basketball. In football, he was a two-time All-Conference honoree where he played tight end. In basketball, he was named the state's Most Valuable Player as a senior.

College career
Carthon accepted a football scholarship from Arkansas State University, where he was coached by Larry Lacewell. In football, he was a two-time All-Southland Conference selection, and as a senior, he was the team's captain and led the team in rushing yards (682).

He finished his college career with 362 carries for 1,583 yards, 26 receptions and 7 touchdowns. He was a member of Kappa Alpha Psi fraternity.

In 1991, Carthon was inducted into the Arkansas State University hall of honor. In 2002, he was inducted into the Arkansas State University ring of honor. He was named to the Southland Conference 1980’s All-Decade team. In 2005, he was inducted into the Arkansas Sports Hall of Fame.

Professional career

New Jersey Generals (USFL)
Carthon was selected by the New Jersey Generals in the 8th round (94th overall) of the 1983 USFL Draft. As a rookie, he collected 90 carries for 334 yards and 3 touchdowns.

In 1984, he started all 18 games, registering 1,042 yards and 11 rushing touchdowns. That same season his backfield mate, Herschel Walker led the league with 1,339 rushing yards.  This was the third time in professional football that teammates had rushed for over 1,000 yards each in the same season (Csonka/Morris – 1972 and Harris/Blier – 1976). Subsequently, it was also achieved by Mack/Byner – 1985; Dunn/Vick – 2006; Jacobs/Ward – 2008; Stewart/Williams – 2009 and Jackson/Ingram - 2019.

In 1985, Carthon played a final season with the Generals, posting 175 carries for 726 yards and 6 touchdowns.

New York Giants
In 1985, he signed as a free agent with the New York Giants. From February to June, his USFL career consisted of 3 preseason games, 18 regular season games, and a final playoff on June 30, 1985.  After reporting to the Giants in July, he played an additional 5 preseason games, 16 regular season games, and two playoff rounds, for a total of 45 contests in less than a year.

Carthon wore the number 44 in his career as a fullback with the New York Giants. He was considered a bruising back with superb blocking skills. Carthon was a very durable player, missing only one game out of 76 when he was with the Giants.

Carthon won two championship rings with the Giants in Super Bowl XXI and Super Bowl XXV. His best season was in 1986, when he finished as the team's second leading rusher with 260 yards, while also helping diminutive halfback Joe Morris rush for a then-franchise record 1,516 yards.

Carthon retired after the 1992 season with 950 career rushing yards, 90 receptions for 745 yards, and 3 touchdowns.

Coaching career
Maurice Carthon resigned as Cleveland Browns offensive coordinator on October 24, 2006 after Cleveland managed only seven points against the Denver Broncos. Under Carthon, the Browns had managed a league-low 232 points in 2005 and had only scored 88 points through six games in 2006. Carthon was the third NFL offensive coordinator to be replaced during the 2006 season.

In early 2008, reports surfaced about a potential reuniting of Carthon and old coach Bill Parcells in Miami. Carthon would not be a candidate for the Miami Dolphins head coaching vacancy, but rather a candidate for offensive coordinator.

Carthon been known as a "Parcells Guy", following his former coach from coaching place to place. He has coached under Parcells for the New England Patriots, the New York Jets and, most recently, the Dallas Cowboys.

On Feb 19, 2009 the Kansas City Chiefs announced that the club added Carthon to head coach Todd Haley’s coaching staff. Carthon served as assistant head coach. When Haley was fired in December 12, 2011, Carthon was retained in the same role under Romeo Crennel. He was let go the following season, 2012, when the Chiefs went 2-14 and has not returned to coaching since.

Personal life
His son Ran Carthon played running back for the Indianapolis Colts, and currently works as general manager for the Tennessee Titans.

References

1961 births
Living people
People from Osceola, Arkansas
People from Passaic County, New Jersey
American football running backs
Arkansas State Red Wolves football players
New Jersey Generals players
New York Giants players
Indianapolis Colts players
African-American coaches of American football
National Football League offensive coordinators
New England Patriots coaches
New York Jets coaches
Dallas Cowboys coaches
Cleveland Browns coaches
Detroit Lions coaches
Arizona Cardinals coaches
Kansas City Chiefs coaches
21st-century African-American people
20th-century African-American sportspeople